King Street is one of the most important thoroughfares of Manchester city centre, England. For much of the 20th century it was the centre of the north-west banking industry but it has become progressively dominated by upmarket retail instead of large banks.

History
King Street began in the 18th century at the Spring Gardens end when the Jacobite party in the town created James's Square and to the west of it a fine street. Beyond what is now Cross Street it was much narrower and one 18th century building remains (a former District Bank). Further west beyond Deansgate is King Street West on a different alignment. By the 1970s there was a clear demarcation between the eastern section of mainly financial and office buildings and the narrower section to the west a mostly up market shopping street (later pedestrianised). Subsequently, the eastern section had the monumental National Westminster Bank offices built at no. 55 and some years later further changes erincreasingly brought more upmarket retail. In 2008 the grand Midland Bank of Edwin Lutyens was vacated by the HSBC Bank.

Old Town Hall 
Manchester's original civic administration (a commission of police) was housed in the Police Office in King Street from 1772; it was near the junction with Deansgate and Police Street is so called because of it. It was replaced by the first Town Hall, to accommodate the growing local government and its civic assembly rooms. The Town Hall, also located in King Street at the corner of Cross Street, was designed by Francis Goodwin and constructed during 1822–25, much of it by David Bellhouse. The building was designed in the Grecian style and Goodwin was strongly influenced by his patron John Soane. As the size and wealth of the city grew, largely as a result of the textile industry, its administration outstripped the existing facilities and a new building was proposed. The King Street building was subsequently occupied by a public library and then Lloyds Bank. The facade was removed to Heaton Park in 1912, when the current Lloyds TSB building was erected on the site (No 53 King Street).

Notable buildings
Many notable buildings survive and are preserved in a conservation area. In King Street there are 11 buildings listed Grade II, two listed Grade II* and one Grade I; in King Street West is one at Grade II and in South King Street nearby three more at Grade II.

53 King Street - Lloyds TSB by Charles Heathcote, (1913)
74 King Street - Northern Rock Building Society by Heathcote and Rawle, (1896)
76-80 King Street - Prudential Assurance Offices by Alfred Waterhouse, (1888)
81 King Street - Manchester Reform Club by Edward Salomons, (1870) Listed Grade II
82 King Street - Former Bank of England Manchester branch, by C.R. Cockerell, (1845) Listed Grade I
84–86 King Street - Former Manchester and Salford Savings Bank by Richard Lane, (1842)
88-96 King Street - Ship Canal House, headquarters of the Manchester Ship Canal, by Harry S. Fairhurst, (1927)
98 King Street - Atlas Chambers by Fairhurst and Michael Waterhouse, (1929)
100 King Street - Midland Bank (HSBC) by Sir Edwin Lutyens, (1929) No longer occupied by HSBC; listed Grade II*.

Shopping area

King Street (along with Bridge Street) is considered Manchester's most upmarket shopping area; it has included the Manchester branches of Hermès, Whistles, Gant, Karen Millen, King Street Grooming, Emporio Armani, DKNY, Diesel, Timberland, Calvin Klein Jeans, Polo Ralph Lauren, Max Mara, T. M. Lewin, Jaeger, Cecil Gee, Agent Provocateur, Mulberry, Thomas Pink, Crombie. (However some of these are on Bridge Street to the south of King Street West.)

The part west of Cross Street was already a shopping street in the early 20th century.

Roger Oldham's 1906 Manchester Alphabet booklet includes the following lines:

See also
List of streets in Manchester

References

External links
 
Listed buildings in Manchester by street (K)
Downloadable map of the Conservation area
King Street Manchester corporate website

Streets in Manchester
Shopping streets in Manchester
Tourist attractions in Manchester